MGM Studios, Inc. v. Grokster, Ltd., 545 U.S. 913 (2005), is a United States Supreme Court decision in which the Court ruled unanimously that the defendants, peer-to-peer file sharing companies Grokster and Streamcast (maker of Morpheus), could be held liable for inducing copyright infringement by users of their file sharing software. The plaintiffs were a consortium of 28 entertainment companies, led by Metro-Goldwyn-Mayer studios.

Background 

Entertainment industry lawsuits against new technologies that enable the copying of copyrighted content date back to the 1980s, when the movie industry sought court injunctions against the sale and use of VCRs. In Sony Corp. v. Universal City Studios, the U.S. Supreme Court ruled that a technology manufacturer cannot be held liable for its users' copyright infringement if widespread unauthorized copying is unlikely, and if the technology enables significant non-infringing uses as well. 

The advent of file sharing via the Internet in the late 1990s, and its enabling of easy and more widespread copying of copyrighted materials, inspired new arguments from the entertainment industry, because copying technology had progressed since the 1980s. The Sony precedent was partially modified in A&M Records v. Napster (2001), which addressed the ease of sharing music files online, and how the designers of the technology could be held liable for contributory copyright infringement and vicarious copyright infringement if such behavior was the primary use of the technology and the company benefited from it. 

Just a few years later, Internet technology had progressed to the point that trading large video files, including those for entire movies, had become viable via popular services including Grokster. The MGM v. Grokster case is frequently characterized as a re-examination of the issues in Sony precedent, in light of rapidly progressing technologies and consumer behaviors. MGM and the other plaintiffs argued that makers of file sharing technology should held liable for their users' copyright infringement, via the contributory and vicarious infringement doctrines.

The entertainment companies appealed to the Supreme Court after losing at two lower courts. The United States District Court for the Central District of California originally dismissed the case in 2003, citing the Sony precedent. On appeal, the Ninth Circuit Court of Appeals upheld the district court's decision after acknowledging that peer-to-peer ("P2P") software has legitimate and legal uses.

Computer and Internet technology companies such as Intel, and trade associations including firms such as Yahoo! and Microsoft, filed amicus curiae briefs in support of the file sharing companies, while the RIAA and MPAA both sided with MGM and the other entertainment companies. Napster, having lost its similar lawsuit about its enabling of users' copyright infringement, filed a brief in support of the entertainment companies. Billionaire Mark Cuban partially financed Grokster's legal battle.

Oral arguments 
During oral argument, the Supreme Court justices appeared divided between the need to protect new technologies and the need to provide remedies against copyright infringement. Justice Antonin Scalia expressed concern that inventors would be chilled from entering the market by the threat of immediate lawsuits. Justice David Souter questioned how the interpretation of the law the plaintiffs argued for would affect devices like copy machines or the iPod.

The music industry suggested that iPods have a substantial and legitimate commercial use in contrast to Grokster, to which Souter replied, "I know perfectly well that I can buy a CD and put it on my iPod. But I also know if I can get music without buying it, I'm going to do so." On the other hand, the justices seemed troubled at the prospect of ruling that Grokster's alleged business model of actively inducing infringement and then reaping the commercial benefits was shielded from liability.

Opinion of the Court 
The opinion of the court was authored by Justice Souter, who wrote: "We hold that one who distributes a device with the object of promoting its use to infringe copyright, as shown by clear expression or other affirmative steps taken to foster infringement, is liable for the resulting acts of infringement by third parties."

While the Court unanimously held that Grokster could be liable for inducing copyright infringement, concurring opinions by several of the Justices showed considerable disagreement over whether the case is substantially different from the Sony precedent, and whether that precedent should be modified. On the one hand, Justice Ginsburg, joined by Kennedy and Rehnquist, claimed that "[t]his case differs markedly from Sony" as there was insufficient evidence of non-infringing uses of the technology. On the other hand, Justice Breyer, joined by Stevens and O'Connor, claimed "a strong demonstrated need for modifying Sony (or for interpreting Sony's standard more strictly) has not yet been shown," primarily because "the nature of ... lawfully swapped files is such that it is reasonable to infer quantities of current lawful use roughly approximate to those at issue in Sony." These justices concurred in the judgment on the narrow ground of Grokster's alleged inducement of its customers to use the product illegally.

In the Grokster ruling, the Court as a whole did not reach a decision to formally overturn the Sony precedent, and instead partially applied it to the specific issues raised by the Grokster and Streamcast technologies. Justice Souter noted: "in the absence of other evidence of intent, a court would be unable to find contributory infringement liability merely based on a failure to take affirmative steps to prevent infringement, if the device otherwise was capable of substantial noninfringing uses. Such a holding would tread too close to the Sony safe harbor." Thus, the Grokster ruling was limited to the specific technologies at issue in the case.

Subsequent developments 
The Grokster decision has been hailed by legal researchers as striking a fair balance between the need to respect the copyrights of artists, and the benefits of allowing and promoting technological innovation. Conversely, others have criticized the decision for its apparent vagueness, contending that it permits financially powerful organizations like the RIAA and MPAA to effectively hinder development of new technology by actively engaging in litigation against the developers and distributors of new technologies.

On November 7, 2005 Grokster announced that it would no longer offer its peer-to-peer file sharing service. As part of a civil lawsuit enabled by this Supreme Court ruling, Grokster was forced to pay $50 million to various companies in the music and movie industries. Stating in 2008, visitors to the Grokster website (www.grokster.com) encountered this message: "YOUR IP address [...] HAS BEEN LOGGED. Don't think you can't get caught. You are not anonymous."

Streamcast continued to fight the suit on remand. On September 27, 2006, the U.S. District Court for the Central District of California ruled in favor of the entertainment companies and held Streamcast liable for the infringement of its users. 

Fearing similar lawsuits, Mark Gorton of LimeWire vowed to stop distributing his file sharing program. A lawsuit was brought against LimeWire, Arista Records LLC v. Lime Group LLC (2010), also led to a ruling in favor of the entertainment industry and an injunction against use of the software. Following that ruling, the download page for the free LimeWire client has a footnote stating: "The download, however, is not a license to upload or download copyrighted material. We urge you to respect copyright and share responsibly."

References

External links

 
Copy of the decision from EFF (PDF)
[ Transcript of oral argument before the U.S. Supreme Court]
Transcript of oral argument before the Ninth Circuit
Stanford case page (archive)
California district court case summary
Filed Briefs
MGM v. Grokster: Day 1 - March 30, 2005 MP3 Newswire recap of first

United States Supreme Court cases
United States copyright case law
United States file sharing case law
United States Supreme Court cases of the Rehnquist Court
2005 in United States case law
American Civil Liberties Union litigation
Copyright infringement of software
Copyright infringement
Metro-Goldwyn-Mayer